= Shocknife =

The Shocknife is a composite training knife for law enforcement, corrections and military personnel equipped with a battery pack to generate an electric shock. It was invented by Canadian Police Officer Jeff Quail.

The Shocknife is notable for the electrical shock it delivers when used in a knife strike. The electrical shock stimulates the nerve fibers in the same way a real knife cut would but without causing injury. This is intended to simulate the pain that would be inflicted by a real cut and to induce similar responses, such as the fight or flight response. The Shocknife is in use by law enforcement agencies and military training programs worldwide.
